Achnasheen railway station is a remote railway station on the Kyle of Lochalsh Line, serving the village of Achnasheen in the north of Scotland. ScotRail, who manage the station, operate all services.

History 

The station was opened by the Dingwall and Skye Railway on 19 August 1870, but operated from the outset by the Highland Railway. The station hotel was built by Alexander Ross and opened in 1871. It was extended by William Roberts in 1898 and again at the turn of the 21st century.

Taken into the London, Midland and Scottish Railway during the Grouping of 1923, the line then passed on to the Scottish Region of British Railways on nationalisation in 1948.

It was once an important railhead, handling passengers, mail and freight bound for parts of Wester Ross, including Gairloch and the Loch Torridon area. A proposal for a  branch line to Aultbea, via Gairloch and Poolewe. Plans for the Loch Maree and Aultbea Railway was put to Parliament in 1893, but the proposal was rejected, as it deemed that the line would not be commercially viable in such a remote area. All freight in this area now travels by road. The station building still serves as a postal distribution point, but the mail travels from Inverness by road.

When sectorisation was introduced by British Rail, the station became part of ScotRail until the Privatisation of British Rail.

Facilities 
Facilities here are very basic, consisting of shelters and benches on both platforms on both platforms, and a help point on platform 1, adjacent to a small car park. Unusually, for such a rural location, there are accessible toilets at the station. As there are no facilities to purchase tickets, passengers must buy one in advance, or from the guard on the train.

Platform layout 
Platform 1 on the eastbound line can accommodate trains having three coaches, whereas platform 2 on the westbound line can hold five.

The loop was once controlled from signal boxes at each end of the station (a common method of working on the HR), but both were closed when Radio Electronic Token Block signalling was introduced by British Rail on the line in 1984.

Passenger volume 

The statistics cover twelve month periods that start in April.

Services 

References

Bibliography

External links

 Station on navigable O.S. map

Railway stations in Highland (council area)
Railway stations served by ScotRail
Railway stations in Great Britain opened in 1870
Former Highland Railway stations
William Roberts railway stations